Tavan Dasht or Tavandasht or Tawan Dasht may refer to:
 Tavan Dasht-e Olya
 Tavan Dasht-e Sofla